Fo Tan is an area of Sha Tin District, New Territories, Hong Kong. It was developed as a light industrial area, but this activity has declined markedly in recent years. There are residential areas to the east, alongside the MTR line, and in the foothills to the west.

Etymology
Fo Tan is located around a river, the Fo Tan Nullah. Historically, a beach was revealed when the water receded. The area thus became known as "river beach". In Hakka, this was pronounced "Fo Tan". It was later mistakenly called "Fire Beach" due to similarities in pronunciation. This has further changed into "Fire Charcoal" which is in current use, again due to similarities in pronunciation.

Location
North East South West To the south is Sha Tin New Town, with the small community of Wo Che in between. To the north is Kau To and the Chinese University of Hong Kong (CUHK). Nearby to the east is Sha Tin Racecourse while across the Shing Mun River is City One Shatin.

Artistic community
Since 2001, as most industrial businesses have closed and moved to mainland China, more than 70 units in the utilitarian industrial blocks have reopened as artists' studios, creating a vibrant if well hidden local arts scene. Every January, a festival, Fotanian - Open Studio Programme, sees many of the studios open to the public. Guided walks lead visitors to these normally private working studios, which encompass a wide range of media and styles such as ceramic and floral design.  Fo Tan was chosen for artist spaces because the ceilings of the buildings are high and because it is in the middle of the New Territories.

Housing

Public housing estates
Chun Yeung Estate
Sui Wo Court

Private housing estates
Private housing estates in Fo Tan include:
Royal Ascot
Jubilee Garden
Scenery Garden
Shatin 33
The Grandville
The Palazzo

Villages
There are originally 24 Hakka villages. Villages in Fo Tan include: 
 Fo Tan Village
 Lok Lo Ha
 Pat Tsz Wo
 Wo Liu Hang

Economy

A.S. Watson Group has its head office in the Watson House in Fo Tan.

Education
Fo Tan is in Primary One Admission (POA) School Net 91. Within the school net are multiple aided schools (operated independently but funded with government money); no government schools are in this net.

Schools in Fo Tan:
Sha Tin College
Sha Tin Junior School
Jockey Club Ti-I College
Hong Kong Sports Institute
Chinese University

Transportation
Fo Tan station on the East Rail line
Buses and minibuses
taxis

See also

 List of areas of Hong Kong
 Ho Tung Lau

References 

 
Restricted areas of Hong Kong red public minibus